Francis Edward Corrigan FRS (born 10 August 1946, in Birkenhead) is a British mathematician, theoretical physicist, and professor at the University of York.

Life
He attended St Bede's College, Manchester 1957-65 and earned a BA (1968) and PhD (1972) at the University of Cambridge.
He was Addison Wheeler Fellow in the Department of Mathematical Sciences Durham University 1972–74, CERN Fellow 1974–75, and worked at Durham from 1976 to 1999 (including as Head of Department 1996–98). He then moved to the University of York where he was Head of Department of Mathematics 1999–2004, 2005–2007 and 2011–2015. He was Principal of Collingwood College, Durham, from 2008 to 2011. His publications can be found via INSPIRE.

References

1946 births
People from Birkenhead
20th-century British mathematicians
21st-century British mathematicians
Academics of the University of York
Alumni of Christ's College, Cambridge
Fellows of the Royal Society
Living people
Academics of Durham University
People associated with CERN